Breweries in Illinois produce a wide range of beers in different styles that are marketed locally, regionally, nationally, and internationally. Brewing companies vary widely in the volume and variety of beer produced,  from small nanobreweries and microbreweries to massive multinational conglomerate macrobreweries. Illinois is the 25th most extensive and the fifth most populous of the 50 states, and is often noted as a microcosm of the entire country. With Chicago in the northeast, small industrial cities, great agricultural productivity, and natural resources like coal, timber, and petroleum in the south, Illinois has a broad economic base.

In 2012 Illinois' 83 breweries and brewpubs employed 1,300 people directly, and more than 45,000 others in related jobs such as wholesaling and retailing. Including people directly employed in brewing, as well as those who supply Illinois' breweries with everything from ingredients to machinery, the total business and personal tax revenue generated by Illinois' breweries and related industries was more than $1.4 billion. Consumer purchases of Illinois' brewery products generated almost $450 million extra in tax revenue. In 2012, according to the Brewers Association, Illinois ranked 36th in the number of craft breweries per capita with 68.

For context, at the end of 2013 there were 2,822 breweries in the United States, including 2,768 craft breweries subdivided into 1,237 brewpubs, 1,412 microbreweries and 119 regional craft breweries.  In that same year, according to the Beer Institute, the brewing industry employed around 43,000 Americans in brewing and distribution and had a combined economic impact of more than $246 billion.

An analysis done in 2015 reported that Chicago craft brewers occupied more square feet of commercial real estate than those of any other U.S. city.  According to the same study, Chicago had 144 craft breweries, second only to Portland, Oregon which had 196.  In 2017, the Chicago Tribune reported that "the Chicago area has the most breweries in the nation, with 202 – topping Denver's 198 and Seattle's 168. The Chicago area includes small portions of Indiana and Wisconsin."

Breweries

Notes:
For the purposes of this list, a brewpub is a taproom with a kitchen; that is, it's a restaurant as well as a brewery.
This list includes locations that produce cider, mead, and makgeolli. Those beverages have an alcohol content similar to that of beer, but they are fermented, not brewed. For locations that produce wine, see List of wineries in Illinois.

Other beer companies
 Around the Bend Beer Company was founded in Chicago in 2015.  Their beer has been brewed at Ale Syndicate,  Excel, and Burnt City.  It is now brewed at District Brew Yards.
 Banging Gavel Brews, Chicago, founded in 2014. The beer is contract brewed at Church Street Brewing.
 Burnt City Brewing, Chicago. Originally named Atlas Brewing Company. The brewpub on Lincoln Avenue opened in 2012. The production brewery on 99th Street opened in 2015. Renamed to Burnt City Brewing in 2016.  The two locations were merged into a new brewery called District Brew Yards in 2019.
Cahoots Brewing was founded in Oak Park in 2013, and is currently based in Forest Park.  The beer is contract brewed at Church Street Brewing Company and Ten Ninety Brewing Company.
Casa Humilde Cervecería Artesanal, Chicago, began operations in 2019 in the District Brew Yards brewery.
 Conrad Seipp Brewing Company, Chicago, opened in 2020 as a revival of the historical Chicago brewery of the same name.  The beer is contract brewed at Metropolitan Brewing.
 Funkytown Brewery, Chicago, opened in 2021. The beer is brewed at Pilot Project in Chicago.
Golden Prairie Fermentations, Chicago. Golden Prairie had its own brewery in the 1990s.  The brand was re-launched by Argus Brewery in 2018.
 Gun Craft Beer, Lake Barrington, started in 2017. The beer is contract brewed at Church Street Brewing in Itasca, Illinois.
 Hidden Hand Brewing, founded in 2021.  The beer is brewed at Solemn Oath in Naperville.
 Hopothesis Beer Company was founded in Chicago in 2013. The beer was contract brewed at Minhas Craft Brewery in Monroe, Wisconsin.  Hopothesis was acquired by Finch Beer Company in 2016.
 Hubbard's Cave is a second brand of beer produced by the Une Année Brewery.
 Karetas Brewing Company was founded in Chicago in 2016.  The beer has been brewed at Ale Syndicate in Chicago and at Church Street Brewing in Itasca.
Keeping Together, founded in 2019. Brewing at Half Acre Beer Company on Lincoln Avenue in Chicago.
 LaGrow Organic Beer Company.  They are using their own brewing equipment at the Aquanaut brewery in Chicago.
 Local Option Bierwerker is based in Chicago.  The beer is contract brewed at different breweries.
 MillerCoors, the second-largest beer company in the United States (after Anheuser-Busch), has its national headquarters in Chicago, but does not operate any breweries in Illinois.
Moor's Brewing Company, Chicago, opened in 2021. The beer is brewed at 18th Street Brewery in Hammond, Indiana.
 Saint Errant Brewing was founded in Chicago in 2016.  The beer is brewed at Mikerphone in Elk Grove Village and at Begyle in Chicago.
 Tocayo Brewing Company was founded in 2015 as a joint venture between chef Rick Bayless and Constellation Brands. The beer is contract brewed at Two Brothers in Warrenville.
 Turner Haus Brewery, Chicago, opened in 2020.
 Twisted Hippo Brewing was founded in Chicago as Rude Hippo in 2014 and was later renamed to Twisted Hippo. The beer was contract brewed at 18th Street Brewery in Gary, Indiana, SlapShot Brewing in Chicago, and Aleman Brewing in Chicago.  They opened their own brewpub in January 2019. It was destroyed by a fire in February 2022. Twisted Hippo started brewing beer at District Brew Yards in August 2022.
 Veteran Beer Company, founded in 2013, is based Chicago.  Their brewery is located in Cold Spring, Minnesota.
WarPigs Brewing Company, founded in Chicago in 2017, started as a joint venture of Mikkeller (in Copenhagen, Denmark) and Three Floyds (in Munster, Indiana).  The beer is contract brewed by Great Central Brewing in Chicago and Wisconsin Brewing in Verona, Wisconsin.  The WarPigs brewpub in Copenhagen opened in 2015. In 2021 Three Floyds dropped out of the partnership with Mikkeller.
Woggly Square Brewing Company, Tinley Park, founded in 2018.  The beer is brewed at 350 Brewing Company.

Closed breweries

Historical breweries: before 1980
 Blattner & Seidenschwanz Brewery, Chicago, opened ca. 1850, closed in 1857.
 Bluff Brewery, Quincy, opened in 1857, closed ca. 1910.
 Bluff City Brewery, Alton.
 Bohemian Brewing Company, Chicago, opened in 1891, closed in 1896.
 William Bohn Brewery, Chicago, opened and closed in 1893.
 Charles Brand & Ernest Hummel Brewing Company, Chicago, opened in 1880, closed in 1997.
 Michael Brand Brewery, Chicago, opened in 1878, closed in 1879.
 Brewer & Hofmann Brewing Company, Chicago, opened in 1886, closed in 1902.
 Brisach & Hessemer Brewery, Chicago, opened in 1858, closed in 1859.
 Broadway Brewing Company, Chicago, opened and closed in 1934.
 Bucher & Hiller Brewery, Chicago, opened in 1858, closed in 1866.
 Conrad Seipp Brewing Company, Chicago, opened in 1854, closed in 1933.
 Dick Brothers Brewery, Quincy, founded in 1856, closed in 1951.
 Eber Brothers Brewery, Quincy, opened ca. 1868, closed in 1906.
 Galena Brewing Company, Galena, opened in 1886, closed in 1936. Makers of Red Stripe beer, not to be confused with the Jamaican beer of the same name.
Gipps Brewing Co., Peoria, Opened in 1881, closed in 1954. Its flagship Amberlin Beer sold to Canadian Ace Brewing Company of Chicago and brewed until 1963.
 Griesedieck Western Brewery, Belleville, makers of Stag beer.
 Hofmann Brothers Brewery, Chicago, closed in 1925.  The related Hofmann Pub in Lyons, located near Hofmann Tower, is also thought to have been a brewery, and was later owned by the Peter Fox Brewing Company; the building was destroyed in a fire in 2013.
 Lill and Diversey Brewery, Chicago, founded 1833.
 Manhattan Brewing Company of Chicago. Opened in 1893; later renamed to Canadian Ace Brewing Company; closed in 1968. Notorious for its connections to Al Capone.
 McAvoy Brewing Company, Chicago, opened in 1865, closed in 1920.
 McHenry Brewery, McHenry, opened in 1868.
 Meyer Brewing Company, Bloomington
 Pabst Brewing Company was founded in Milwaukee, Wisconsin in 1844.  They operated a brewery in Peoria Heights, Illinois from 1934 to 1982.
 Peacock Brewery is located in Rockford.  The original brewhouse was built in 1857.  It was successively owned by the Peacock Brewing Company, the Rockford Brewing Company, and the Rock River Brewing Company, the last of which closed in 1939.
 Peru Beer Company, Peru, opened in 1868, closed in 1943.
 Peter Hand Brewing Company (later known as Meister Brau Brewery), Chicago, the original makers of Meister Brau beer (and Meister Brau Lite); sold their Meister Brau line of beers to Miller in 1972 (who rebranded Meister Brau Lite as Miller Lite) and finally ceased brewing in 1977. They were the last brewery to operate in the city until 1987.
 Reisch Brewery, Springfield, founded in 1849, closed 1966.
 Ruff Brewing Company, Quincy, founded in 1855, closed 1948.
 Schoenhofen Brewing Company, Chicago, makers of Edelweiss beer and Green River soda.
 Sieben's Brewery of Chicago, noted as a point of dispute between Dean O'Banion and Al Capone during Prohibition. See North Side Gang.
 Star Union Brewery, Peru, closed in 1966.
 Stenger Brewery, also known as J and N Stenger Brewery, Naperville, founded in 1848, closed in 1893.
Warsaw Brewery, Warsaw, founded in 1861, ceased production in 1971. Reopened as a bar and restaurant in 2006.
White Eagle Brewery, Chicago, opened in 1904, closed in 1950.

Modern breweries: after 1980
 25 West Brewing Company, brewpub in Bloomingdale, opened in 2018, closed in 2020.
 350 Brewing Company, brewpub in Tinley Park, opened in 2014, closed in 2022.
 4 Paws Brewing, Chicago microbrewery, opened in 2013, closed in 2014, sold to Aquanaut Brewing.
 57 70 Brewery, Teutopolis, opened in 2018.
 5 Rabbit Cervecería. Founded in Chicago in 2011.  Originally the beer was contract brewed.  They opened their own brewery in Bedford Park in 2012, and added a taproom in 2014. They closed in 2020.
 718 Brew Cafe, brewpub in Metropolis, opened in 2016.
 Abbey Ridge Brewery and Tap Room, brewpub in Pomona, opened in 2014, destroyed by a fire in 2017.
 Ale Syndicate was founded in Chicago in 2013.  The beer was originally contract brewed at several locations, including Big Chicago Brewing Company, Galena Brewing Company, and Excel Brewing Company.  The brewery opened in 2014.  It closed in 2016.
 America's Brewpub in the Walter Payton Roundhouse, Aurora, opened in 1996, closed in 2011.
 Andersonville Brewing. The Hamburger Mary's restaurant chain opened a location in Chicago in 2006.  A brewery and taproom called Mary's Rec Room was added in 2009. The brewery was renamed to Andersonville Brewing in 2014. It closed in 2019.
 Aquanaut Brewing Company, Chicago, opened in 2014, closed in 2017.
 Arcade Brewery opened in Chicago in 2014, and operated as an alternating proprietorship at the Ale Syndicate brewery.  It closed in 2016.
 Argus Brewery, Chicago. Opened in 2009, in a building built in 1906 as a Schlitz beer distribution facility.  Closed in 2020.
 Baderbräu Brewing Company. In 2012 they revived Baderbräu beer, which initially was contract brewed at the Stevens Point Brewery in Stevens Point, Wisconsin.  The Chicago brewery and tap room opened in 2016, and added a kitchen in 2017.  It closed in 2018.
 Ballast Point Tasting Room and Kitchen, Chicago brewpub. Ballast Point Brewing Company was founded in San Diego in 1996.  It was acquired by Constellation Brands in 2015.  The brewpub in Chicago opened in 2018.  Most of the beer there came from Ballast Point breweries in California and Virginia, but some was brewed onsite.  Ballast Point was acquired by Kings & Convicts Brewing Company in 2019.  They closed the Chicago location in 2021.
 Band of Bohemia, Chicago brewpub that won a Michelin star, opened in 2015, closed in 2020.
 Berghoff beer was first brewed in Fort Wayne, Indiana in 1887, and has been served at the Bergoff restaurant in downtown Chicago since 1898, except during Prohibition.  From 1954 to 2018, the beer was produced under contract — first by the Falstaff Brewing Company in St. Louis, Missouri, then by the Joseph Huber Brewing Company in Monroe, Wisconsin, and then by Stevens Point Brewery in Stevens Point, Wisconsin. Berghoff also had a separate brewpub in Chicago from 1990 to 1993.
 Big Chicago Brewing Company, Zion, contract brewer for beers such as Ten Ninety, Cahoots, and Middle Brow.  Founded in 2012, they were bought out by Ten Ninety in 2014.
Big Hurt Beer was owned by former baseball player Frank Thomas.  The Big Hurt Brewhouse restaurant in Berwyn opened in 2014 and closed in 2016.  It reopened in 2017 under the name 35 Sports Bar & Grill, and closed again in 2018. The beer, which was also available in cans, was contract brewed by Minhas Craft Brewery in Monroe, Wisconsin.
 Black Belt Brewery, Lake Zurich, production brewery with a canning line, opened in 2016, closed in 2017.
 Blue Cat Brewing Company, brewpub in Rock Island. Opened as Blue Cat Brew Pub in 1994. Closed in 2018. Reopened as Big Swing Brewing Company in 2019. Renamed to Blue Cat Brewing Company in 2021. Closed in 2022.
 Blue Nose Brewery and taproom, opened in Justice in 2012, moved to Hodgkins in 2015, closed in 2021.
 Border Town Pub, Momence. Bar opened in 2002. In-house brewery began operations in 2014. Closed in 2018.
 Box Office Brewery and Restaurant, DeKalb, opened in 1994, closed in 1998.
 Brass Restaurant & Brewery, South Barrington, opened in 2003, closed in 2009.
 BreakRoom Brewery, Chicago brewpub, opened in 2015, closed in 2016.
 Cademon Brewing Company, brewery and taproom in Genoa, opened in 2014, closed in 2016.
 Capitol City Brewing, Springfield.
 Carlyle Brewing Company, Rockford brewpub, opened in 2003, closed in 2021.
 Chain O' Lakes Brewing Company, McHenry taproom, opened in 2013 in the old McHenry Brewery building, closed in 2018.
 Chicago Brewing Company, Chicago, opened in 1989.
 Chief's Brewing Company, Champaign, became Joe's Brewery.
 Copper Dragon Brewing Company, Carbondale.  Opened in 1996. Ceased brewing in 2005 but stayed open as a music venue. Closed in 2019.
 Crooked Waters, Peoria brewpub, closed in 2000.
 Dry City Brew Works, brewery and taproom in Wheaton, opened in 2014, closed in 2023.
 Effing Brew Company, brewpub in Effingham, opened in 2018, closed in 2022.
Emmett's Brewing Company, Wheaton brewpub closed ca. 2021; their other locations are still open.
Empirical Brewery, Chicago. Opened in 2014. In 2015 they added a taproom. Closed in 2022.
 Finch Beer Company, Chicago.  Opened in 2011 as Finch's Beer Company.  In 2016 they changed their name to Finch Beer Company and opened a brewpub at a second location, which closed later that year.  In 2017 they bought the Like Minds brewery and moved their operations there.  In 2020 they opened a brewpub called The Perch at a separate location. The brewery closed in 2022.
 Flatlander's Restaurant and Brewery, Lincolnshire, opened in 1996, closed in 2012.
 Flesk Brewing, opened in Lombard in 2013.  Moved to Barrington and added a taproom in 2017. Closed in 2023.
 Gino's Brewing Company, Chicago. Gino's East added a brewery at its River North restaurant in 2015.  The restaurant and brewery closed in 2020.
 Glen Ellyn Sports Brew, Glen Ellyn.
 Golden Prairie Brewing, Chicago, opened in 1992, closed in 1999.
 Gordon Biersch Brewery Restaurants originated in Palo Alto, California in 1988 and became a multi-state chain.  The location in Bolingbrook opened in 2007.  It was rebranded as a Rock Bottom Restaurant & Brewery in 2018.
 Govnor's Public House, Lake in the Hills, opened in 2001, closed in 2008.
Granite City is an interstate chain of brewpubs.  The locations in Orland Park, East Peoria, and Northbrook closed in 2019. The one in Rockford closed in 2020.  Several other Illinois locations are still open.
 Harrison's Restaurant and Brewery, Orland Park, opened in 1998, closed in 2013.
 Hopcats Brewing Company, Chicago brewpub, opened in 1998.
 Hopper's Garage Brewing Company, Antioch brewery, opened in 2015.
 Illinois Brewing Company, Bloomington, opened in 1999, brewery became operational in 2000, closed in 2014.
 Joe's Brewery, Champaign, ceased brewing, bar still open.
 J.W. Platek's Restaurant & Brewery, Richmond, closed in 2010.
 Knox County Brewing Company, brewery and taproom in Galesburg, opened in 2018, closed in 2022.
Lake Zurich Brewing Company, Lake Zurich, opened in 2018, closed in 2020.
Like Minds Brewing Company, founded in 2014.  The beer was originally contract brewed by Hinterland in Green Bay, Wisconsin. In 2015 Like Minds moved to Chicago and opened their own brewery. In 2016 they opened a second location, a brewpub in Milwaukee, Wisconsin.  In 2017 they sold their Chicago brewery to Finch Beer Company.  In 2018 the Milwaukee location closed.
 Limestone Brewing Company, Plainfield brewpub, opened in 2009, closed in 2012.
Mad Mouse Brewing Company, Chicago, opened in 2014 in the Moxee restaurant, closed in 2017.
 Moonshine, Chicago bar and restaurant that opened in 2001, added an in-house brewery in 2008, and closed in 2014.
 Motor Row Brewing, brewery and taproom in Chicago, opened in 2015, closed in 2021.
 M.T. Barrels Restaurant & Brewery, West Dundee.
 Myths and Legends Brewing Company, brewery and taproom in Westmont.  Opened in 2013 as Urban Legend Brewing Company. Renamed to Myths and Legends in 2016.  Bought out by Whiskey Hill in 2018.
Nevin's Brewing Company, Plainfield brewpub, opened in 2012.  The brewery was renamed to Midnight Pig Beer in 2017. Closed in 2019.
 North Shore Cider Company, cider brewery and taproom in Evanston, opened in 2017, closed in 2021.
 Oak Park Brewing Company, brewery and brewpub in Oak Park co-located with Hamburger Mary's Show Lounge; opened in 2016, closed in 2021.
 O'Grady's Brewery and Pub, Arlington Heights, opened in 1996.
 O'Griff's Grill & Brewhouse, Quincy, opened in 1994, closed in 2019.
 Only Child Brewing, brewery and taproom, opened in Northbrook in 2013, moved to Gurnee in 2015, closed in 2022.
 Pavichevich Brewing Company, Elmhurst, original makers of Baderbräu beer, opened in 1988, closed in 1997.
 Peoria Brewing  Company, Peoria, production brewery and brewpub, opened in 2014, closed in 2017.
 Prairie Krafts Brewing Company, brewery and taproom in Buffalo Grove, opened in 2016, closed in 2020.
 Prairie Rock Brewing Company. The Elgin brewpub opened in 1995 and closed in 2009; the Schaumburg brewpub opened in 1999 and closed in 2007.
 The Ram Restaurant & Brewery originated in Lakewood, Washington in 1971. It became a national chain with about 20 locations.  The brewpub in Schaumburg opened in 2000 and closed in 2018.  The brewpub in Wheeling opened in 2001 and closed in 2019.  The Rosemont location, which did not brew beer on site, opened in 2003 and closed in 2020.
Reinstone Brewery, Illiopolis, opened in 2016.
 River Hawk Brewing, Channahon taproom, opened in 2017, closed in 2022.
 The Rock Bottom Restaurant & Brewery in Chicago closed in 2023, after being open for more than 20 years. The one in Bolingbrook opened in 2018 and closed in 2022. Other Rock Bottom locations in Illinois are still open.
 Rolling Meadows Brewery, farm-to-table brewery in Cantrall, opened in 2011, closed in 2020.
 Ryan Brewing Company, microbrewery and taproom in Roscoe, opened in 2018, closed in 2018.
 Scallywag Brewing Company, brewery and taproom in Westmont, opened in 2019, closed in 2020.
 Seery Athlone Brewing Company, brewery and taproom in Addison, opened in 2018, closed in 2019.
 ShadowView Brewing, Woodstock, restaurant opened in 2018, added a brewery in 2019, closed in 2023.
 Side Lot Brewery, Wauconda brewpub, opened in 2016. Ceased brewing in 2022, still open as a restaurant called The Side Lot.
 Sieben's River North, Chicago brewpub, opened in 1987, closed in 1990.  The first modern-era craft brewery in Chicago.
 SlapShot Brewing Company, Chicago, opened in 2013, closed in 2016.
 Slow City Makgeolli was the country's largest and highest-profile maker of makgeolli, a fermented rice beverage native to Korea with an alcohol content similar to that of beer.  A subsidiary of Baesangmyun Brewery, it opened in Niles in 2013. It closed ca. 2016.
 Small Town Brewery, Wauconda, opened in 2011, tap room opened in 2015, closed in 2019.
 Smylie Brothers Brewing Company. The brewpub in Evanston opened in 2014. The production brewery on Wolcott Avenue in Chicago opened in 2017. The brewpub on Broadway Street in Chicago opened in 2021 and closed in 2022.  The brewpub in Evanston closed later that year.
 Stunt Brewing Company, nanobrewery and taproom in Glenview, opened in 2021, closed in 2022.
 The Tap & Growler, Chicago, opened in 1987, closed in 1992.
 Taylor Brewing Company, Lombard brewpub, closed in 2011.
 Three Angels Brewing, Yorkville, opened in 2012.
 Timotheus Brothers Brewery, Springfield, opened in 2015, closed in 2018.
 Urban Brew Labs, Chicago, opened in 2018 as Urban Renewal Brewery. They later changed their name to Urban Brew Labs. Added a taproom in 2021. Closed in 2022.
 Vice District Brewing Company. The brewery and taproom in Chicago opened in 2014.  A larger brewery and taproom in Homewood opened in 2018.  The Chicago location closed in 2019.  The Homewood location closed later that year.
 Weeghman Park Restaurant Brewery, Chicago brewpub, opened in 1997, closed in 1999.
 The Weinkeller was a restaurant in Berwyn that added a brewery in 1988. They opened a second location in Westmont in 1992.

See also 
 Beer in the United States
 List of breweries in the United States
 List of microbreweries
 List of wineries in Illinois

References

External links

Illinois Craft Brewers Guild

Illinois
Lists of companies based in Illinois
Breweries